Ercole Tambosi (died 1570) was a Roman Catholic prelate who served as Bishop of Ravello (1555–1570).

Biography
On 19 Sep 1555, Ercole Tambosi was appointed during the papacy of Pope Paul IV as Bishop of Ravello.
He served as Bishop of Ravello until his death in 1570.

See also 
Catholic Church in Italy

References

External links and additional sources
 (for Chronology of Bishops) 
 (for Chronology of Bishops)  

16th-century Italian Roman Catholic bishops
Bishops appointed by Pope Paul IV
1570 deaths